The year 1961 was the 180th year of the Rattanakosin Kingdom of Thailand. It was the 16th year in the reign of King Bhumibol Adulyadej (Rama IX), and is reckoned as year 2504 in the Buddhist Era.

Incumbents
King: Bhumibol Adulyadej 
Crown Prince: (vacant)
Prime Minister: Sarit Thanarat 
Supreme Patriarch: Ariyavongsagatanana III

Events

January

February

March

April
An advance party of the 6010th Tactical Group, USAF, arrived at Don Muang at the request of the Royal Thai government to establish an aircraft warning system. Six F-100s from the 510TFS/405FW based at Clark Air Base were deployed to Don Muang in operation "Bell Tone".

May

June

July

August

September

October

November
Four RF-101C reconnaissance aircraft of the 45th Tactical Reconnaissance Squadron stationed at Misawa AB, Japan, and their photo lab arrived at Don Muang under "Operation Able Marble". The RF-101s were sent to assist RTAF RT-33 aircraft in performing aerial reconnaissance flights over Laos. Detachment 10, 13th Air Force was established to support USAF operations.

December

Births

Chuwit Kamolvisit – politician, one-time massage parlor owner
Sudarat Keyuraphan – politician, served as the Minister of Agriculture and Cooperatives
Apirak Kosayodhin – former business executive and former governor of Bangkok
Jira Maligool – film director, screenwriter and producer
Noppadon Pattama – politician, Foreign Minister of Thailand 2008
Panna Rittikrai – martial arts action choreographer, film director, screenwriter and actor
Pongpat Wachirabunjong – singer, actor and film director

Deaths

See also
 List of Thai films#1960s

References

External links

 
Years of the 20th century in Thailand
Thailand
Thailand
1960s in Thailand